Corynetis is a genus of archaeopriapulid known from the Chengjiang biota, and a senior synonym of Anningvermis multispinosus.

References

Priapulida
Prehistoric protostome genera

Cambrian genus extinctions